WDIS (1170 AM) was a radio station licensed to Norfolk, Massachusetts.  It served the suburban communities south of Boston and north of Providence, Rhode Island.  It had a daytime-only 1,000-watt signal that reached as far west as Worcester, Massachusetts, giving it a coverage area of almost a half-million people. As of June 13, 2014, WDIS was silent. The FCC cancelled the license and deleted the call sign for WDIS on October 13, 2015.

History
WDIS began as a construction permit applied for on January 16, 1976, as a 500-watt station by John Quinlan, a former Massachusetts state legislator. Quinlan obtained a license from the Federal Communications Commission (FCC) to broadcast on 1170 kHz with the call sign WJMQ on March 7, 1978.  The studio was located on Pond Street (Route 115) near Norfolk center. WJMQ applied for an increase in power to 1 kW on June 7, 1978. The power increase was completed and a license to cover was applied for on January 19, 1979. That license was granted on July 30, 1979.

During the 1980s, the station changed ownership and on October 27, 1982, changed its call sign to WJCC. In 1990, it once again changed ownership, to Brockton, Massachusetts-based Discussion Radio, Inc.  On February 3, 1993, WJCC became WDIS. The station was affiliated with the Business Talk Radio Network, Fox News Radio and Westwood One.

In 2007, WDIS aired Tri-County Cougar home football games at the Tri-County Regional Vocational Technical High School in Franklin, Massachusetts.  In 2008, they resumed broadcasting  Walpole High School Rebels football team live on the internet as well as over the air (daytime games live, night games on tape given the station's daytime-only status). Beginning in December 2008, WDIS had also broadcast all King Philip High School Boys Basketball games, as that basketball program tried to rebound after two consecutive no-win seasons.

According to FCC filings, WDIS notified the FCC it was silent as of June 13, 2014, confirmed by the station on Twitter on June 25 and June 29. On August 5, 2015, a letter was sent by the FCC to WDIS's owner, Albert Grady seeking an update of the operational status of the station within 30 days, or the license would be automatically terminated for violation of section 312(g) of the Communications Act (failure to broadcast for 12 consecutive months). The FCC received a response on September 8, 2015 from William J. McGrath stating that the station's studio & transmitter building had been condemned as unsafe by the town of Norfolk after an inspection on June 2, 2014.

On October 13, 2015, the FCC issued its decision to cancel WDIS's license, stating that the station had been off the air for over 12 months and Section 312(g) of the Communications Act required the license to be deleted as a matter of law.

References

External links
Radio Discussions board about WDIS being silent
WDIS's Twitter page, accessed June 9, 2015

DIS
News and talk radio stations in the United States
Defunct radio stations in the United States
Radio stations established in 1978
Radio stations disestablished in 2015
Walpole, Massachusetts
Mass media in Norfolk County, Massachusetts
1978 establishments in Massachusetts
2015 disestablishments in Massachusetts
DIS
DIS